Lisbeth Guiselle Moreno Robelo (born 6 August 2000) is a Nicaraguan footballer who plays as a midfielder for Real Estelí FC and the Nicaragua women's national team.

Club career
Moreno has played for Real Estelí in Nicaragua.

International career
Moreno represented Nicaragua at two CONCACAF Women's U-20 Championship editions (2018 and 2020). She capped at senior level during the 2020 CONCACAF Women's Olympic Qualifying Championship qualification.

References 

2000 births
Living people
Nicaraguan women's footballers
Women's association football midfielders
Nicaragua women's international footballers